Hydrophis ornatus, commonly known as the ornate reef sea snake,  is a species of venomous sea snake in the family Elapidae.

Distribution
This snake-species is found to occur in Andaman & Nicobar Islands, Bahrain, Bangladesh, Cambodia, China (Coasts of Guangxi, Guangdong, Hainan, Hong Kong and Shandong), India (from Gujarat, through Kerala and Tamil Nadu to West Bengal), Indonesia (Bali, Borneo, Java, Sulawesi, Sumatra and other Island coasts), Iran, Iraq, Japan (incl. Ryukyu Is.), Kuwait, Malaysia, Myanmar, New Caledonia, Oman, Pakistan, Palau, Papua New Guinea, Philippines, Qatar, Saudi Arabia, Singapore, Sri Lanka, Taiwan, Thailand, United Arab Emirates (UAE) and Vietnam. It is also reported from Australia (Western Australia, Northern Territory, Queensland and New South Wales), Brunei, Fiji, Samoa, Solomon Islands, Tonga, Vanuatu Kiribati and Iraq.

References

Further reading
 Bussarawitt, S.; Rasmussen, A.R. & Andersen, M. 1989. A preliminary study on sea snakes (Hydrophiidae) from Phuket Harbor, Phuket Island, Thailand. Nat. Hist. Bull. Siam Soc., Bangkok 37 (2): 209–225.
 Gray, J.E. 1842. Monographic Synopsis of the Water Snakes, or the Family of Hydridae. The Zoological Miscellany pp. 59–68.
 Mittleman, M.B. 1947. Geographic variation in the sea snake, Hydrophis ornatus (Gray) Proceedings of the Biological Society of Washington 60: 1–8.
 Rasmussen, A.R. 1989. An analysis of Hydrophis ornatus (Gray), H. lamberti Smith, and H. inornatus (Gray) (Hydrophiidae, Serpentes) based on samples from various localities, with remarks on feeding and breeding biology of H. ornatus. Amphibia-Reptilia 10: 397–417.

External links
 

ornatus
Reptiles of Pakistan
Reptiles of Western Australia
Reptiles of Japan
Reptiles described in 1842
Taxa named by John Edward Gray
Snakes of Australia